Mount Alford is a flat-topped, ice-free mountain (1,480 m) at the south side of Boggs Valley in the Helliwell Hills. Mapped by United States Geological Survey (USGS) from surveys and U.S. Navy air photos, 1960–63. Named by Advisory Committee on Antarctic Names (US-ACAN) for Montague Alford, United States Antarctic Research Program (USARP) geologist at McMurdo Station, 1967–68. The mountain is situated on the Pennell Coast, a portion of Antarctica lying between Cape Williams and Cape Adare.

Mountains of Victoria Land
Pennell Coast